, otherwise known as  and , was a Japanese samurai and daimyō (feudal lord) of the late Sengoku period regarded as the second "Great Unifier" of Japan.

Hideyoshi rose from a peasant background as a retainer of the prominent lord Oda Nobunaga to become one of the most powerful men in Japan. Hideyoshi succeeded Nobunaga after the Honnō-ji Incident in 1582 and continued Nobunaga's campaign to unite Japan that led to the closing of the Sengoku period. Hideyoshi became the de facto leader of Japan and acquired the prestigious positions of Chancellor of the Realm and Imperial Regent by the mid-1580s. Hideyoshi launched the Japanese invasions of Korea in 1592 to initial success, but eventual military stalemate damaged his prestige before his death in 1598. Hideyoshi's young son and successor Toyotomi Hideyori was displaced by Tokugawa Ieyasu at the Battle of Sekigahara in 1600 which would lead to the founding of the Tokugawa Shogunate.

Hideyoshi's rule covers most of the Azuchi–Momoyama period of Japan, partially named after his castle, Momoyama Castle. Hideyoshi left an influential and lasting legacy in Japan, including Osaka Castle, the Tokugawa class system, the restriction on the possession of weapons to the samurai, and the construction and restoration of many temples, some of which are still visible in Kyoto.

Early life (1537–1558) 

Very little is known for certain about Toyotomi Hideyoshi before 1570, when he begins to appear in surviving documents and letters. His autobiography starts in 1577, but in it, Hideyoshi spoke very little about his past.

According to tradition, Hideyoshi was born on 17 March 1538 in Nakamura, Owari Province (present-day Nakamura Ward, Nagoya), in the middle of the chaotic Sengoku period under the collapsed Ashikaga Shogunate. Hideyoshi had no traceable samurai lineage, and his father Kinoshita Yaemon was an ashigaru – a peasant employed by the samurai as a foot soldier. Yaemon died in 1543 when Hideyoshi was seven years old.

Many legends describe Hideyoshi being sent to study at a temple as a young man, but he rejected temple life and went in search of adventure. Under the name , he first joined the Imagawa clan as a servant to a local ruler named . Hideyoshi traveled all the way to the lands of Imagawa Yoshimoto, the daimyo based in Suruga Province, and served there for a time, only to abscond with a sum of money entrusted to him by Matsushita Yukitsuna.

Service under Nobunaga (1558–1582) 

In 1558, Hideyoshi became an ashigaru for the powerful Oda clan, the rulers of his home province of Owari, now headed by the ambitious Oda Nobunaga.
Hideyoshi soon became Nobunaga's sandal-bearer, a position of relatively high status. According to his biographers, Hideyoshi also supervised the repair of Kiyosu Castle, a claim described as "apocryphal", and managed the kitchen. After Nobunaga noticed his talents, when Nobunaga defeated Imagawa Yoshimoto at the Battle of Okehazama in 1560, he become one of Nobunaga’s trusted retainers.

In 1561, Hideyoshi married One, the adopted daughter of Asano Nagakatsu, a descendant of Minamoto no Yorimitsu. Hideyoshi carried out repairs on Sunomata Castle with his younger half-brother, Hashiba Koichirō, along with Hachisuka Masakatsu, and Maeno Nagayasu. Hideyoshi's efforts were well-received because Sunomata was in enemy territory, and according to legend Hideyoshi constructed a fort in Sunomata overnight and discovered a secret route into Mount Inaba, after which much of the local garrison surrendered.

In 1564, Hideyoshi was very successful as a negotiator. He managed to convince, mostly with liberal bribes, a number of Mino warlords to desert the Saitō clan. Hideyoshi approached many Saitō clan samurai and convinced them to submit to Nobunaga, including the Saitō clan's strategist, Takenaka Shigeharu.

Nobunaga's easy victory at the siege of Inabayama Castle in 1567 was largely due to Hideyoshi's efforts, and despite his peasant origins, in 1568 Hideyoshi became one of Nobunaga's most distinguished generals, eventually taking the name .

In 1570, Hideyoshi protected Nobunaga's retreat from Azai-Asakura forces at Kanegasaki. Hideyoshi's rear-guard defense of his lord's escape is one of his fabled accomplishments under Nobunaga. Later in June 1570, at the Battle of Anegawa, in which Oda Nobunaga allied with Tokugawa Ieyasu to lay siege to two fortresses of the Azai and Asakura clans, Hideyoshi was assigned to lead Oda troops into open battle for the first time.

In 1573, after victorious campaigns against the Azai and Asakura, Nobunaga appointed Hideyoshi daimyō of three districts in the northern part of Ōmi Province. Initially, Hideyoshi based at the former Azai headquarters at Odani Castle but moved to Kunitomo town and renamed it "Nagahama" in tribute to Nobunaga. Hideyoshi later moved to the port at Imahama on Lake Biwa, where he began work on Imahama Castle and took control of the nearby Kunitomo firearms factory that had been established some years previously by the Azai and Asakura. Under Hideyoshi's administration, the factory's output of firearms increased dramatically. Later, Hideyoshi participated in the 1573 siege of Nagashima.

In 1574, Hideyoshi along with Araki Murashige, captured Itami Castle and later in 1575, fought in the Battle of Nagashino against the Takeda clan.

In 1576, he took part at the Siege of Mitsuji part of the eleven-year Ishiyama Hongan-ji War. Later, Nobunaga sent Hideyoshi to Himeji Castle to conquer the Chūgoku region from the Mori clan. Hideyoshi then fought in the Battle of Tedorigawa (1577), the siege of Miki (1578), the siege of Tottori (1581) and also Siege of Takamatsu (1582).

Death of Nobunaga 

During the Siege of Takamatsu, on June 21, 1582, Oda Nobunaga and his eldest son and heir, Nobutada, were killed in the Honnō-ji incident by the forces of the traitorous Akechi Mitsuhide. Their assassination in Honnō-ji temple in Kyoto ended Nobunaga's quest to consolidate centralised power in Japan under his authority.

Hideyoshi, seeking vengeance for the death of his lord, made peace with the Mōri clan and thirteen days later met Mitsuhide and defeated him at the Battle of Yamazaki, avenging his lord (Nobunaga) and taking Nobunaga's authority and power for himself.

Rise to power (1582–1585)

Construction of Osaka Castle 

In 1582, Hideyoshi began construction of Osaka Castle. Built on the site of the temple Ishiyama Hongan-ji, which was destroyed by Nobunaga, in 1597, construction was completed and the castle would become the last stronghold of the Toyotomi clan after Hideyoshi's death.

Conflict with Katsuie 

In 1583 Hideyoshi was in a very strong position. He summoned the powerful daimyō to Kiyosu Castle so that they could determine Nobunaga's heir. Oda Nobukatsu and Oda Nobutaka quarreled, causing Hideyoshi to instead choose Nobunaga's grandson Samboshi, whose other name was Hidenobu. Having won the support of the other two Oda clan elders, Niwa Nagahide and Ikeda Tsuneoki, Hideyoshi established Hidenobu's position, as well as his own influence in the Oda clan. He distributed Nobunaga's provinces among the generals and formed a council of four generals to help him govern. Tension quickly escalated between Toyotomi Hideyoshi and Shibata Katsuie, and at the Battle of Shizugatake in the following year, Hideyoshi destroyed Katsuie's forces. Hideyoshi had thus consolidated his own power, dealt with most of the Oda clan, and controlled 30 provinces. The famous kirishitan daimyo and samurai Dom Justo Takayama fought on his side at this epic battle.

Conflict with Ieyasu 

In 1584, Nobunaga's other son, Oda Nobukatsu, remained hostile to Hideyoshi. Nobukatsu allied himself with Tokugawa Ieyasu, and the two sides fought at the inconclusive Battle of Komaki and Nagakute. It ultimately resulted in a stalemate, although Hideyoshi's forces were delivered a heavy blow. Ieyasu and Hideyoshi never actually fought against each other themselves but the former managed to check the advance of the latter's allies. Finally, Hideyoshi made peace with Nobukatsu, ending the pretext for war between the Tokugawa and Hashiba clans. Hideyoshi sent Tokugawa Ieyasu his younger sister Asahi no kata and mother Ōmandokoro as hostages.

Toyotomi clan 

Like Oda Nobunaga before him, Hideyoshi never achieved the title of shōgun. Instead, he arranged to have himself adopted by Konoe Sakihisa, one of the noblest men belonging to the Fujiwara clan and secured a succession of high court titles Chancellor (Daijō-daijin), including, in 1585, the prestigious position of Imperial Regent (kampaku). Also in 1585, Hideyoshi was formally given the new clan name Toyotomi (instead of Fujiwara) by the Imperial Court. He built a lavish palace, the Jurakudai, in 1587, and entertained the reigning Emperor, Emperor Go-Yōzei, the following year.

Unification of Japan (1585–1592)

Negoro-ji Campaign 

Afterwards in 1585, Hideyoshi launched the siege of Negoro-ji and subjugated Kii Province. The Negoro-gumi, the warrior monks of Negoro-ji, were quite skilled in the use of firearms, and were devout followers of Shingi, a branch of the Shingon sect of Buddhism. They were allied with the Ikkō-ikki, and with Tokugawa Ieyasu, one of Toyotomi's chief rivals. In particular, they attracted Hideyoshi's ire for their support of Tokugawa in the Battle of Komaki and Nagakute the previous year. After attacking a number of other warrior monk outposts in the area, Hideyoshi's force turned to the monastery of Negoro-ji, attacking it from two sides. By this time, many of the Negoro-gumi had already fled to Ōta Castle. Later, Hideyoshi besieged Ōta Castle. The complex was set aflame, beginning with the residences of the priests, and Hideyoshi's samurai cut down monks as they escaped the blazing buildings.

Shikoku Campaign 

In the 1585 invasion of Shikoku, Toyotomi forces seized and conquered Shikoku island, the smallest of Japan's four main islands, from Chōsokabe Motochika. Toyotomi's forces arrived 113,000 strong under Toyotomi Hidenaga, Toyotomi Hidetsugu, Ukita Hideie and the Mōri clan's "Two Rivers", Kobayakawa Takakage and Kikkawa Motoharu. Opposing them were 40,000 men of Chōsokabe's. Despite the overwhelming size of Hideyoshi's army, and the suggestions of his advisors, Motochika chose to fight to defend his territories. The battles culminated in the siege of Ichinomiya Castle, which lasted for 26 days. Chōsokabe made a half-hearted attempt to relieve his castle from the siege, but surrendered in the end. He was allowed to keep Tosa Province, while the rest of Shikoku was divided among Hideyoshi's generals.

Toyama Campaign 

During the late summer of August 1585, Hideyoshi launched an attack on Etchū Province and Hida Province. Toyotomi Hideyoshi dispatched Kanamori Nagachika  to destroy the Anegakōji clan of Hida and he carried out the siege of Toyama Castle. The Toyama Castle garrison was led by Sassa Narimasa, one of his former allies many years back. Hideyoshi led his army of around 100,000 soldiers against the 20,000 men of the Sassa Narimasa forces; in the end, Narimasa's defense was shattered, opening the way for Toyotomi's supremacy over Etchū Province and Hida Province.

Kyushu Campaign 

In 1586 Toyotomi Hideyoshi conquered Kyūshū, wresting control from the Shimazu clan. Toyotomi Hidenaga, half-brother to Hideyoshi, landed to the south of Bungo on Kyūshū's eastern coast. Meanwhile, Hideyoshi took his own forces down a more western route, in Chikuzen Province. Later that year, with a total of 200,000 soldiers against the 30,000 men of the Shimazu forces, the two brothers would meet up in the Shimazu home province of Satsuma. They besieged Kagoshima castle, the Shimazu clan's home. The Shimazu surrendered, leaving Hideyoshi to return his attention to the Hōjō clan of Kantō, the last major clan to oppose him.

Later in 1587, Hideyoshi banished Christian missionaries from Kyūshū, to exert greater control over the Kirishitan daimyō. However, since he did much trade with Europeans, individual Christians were overlooked unofficially.

Sword Hunt 

In 1588, Hideyoshi forbade ordinary peasants from owning weapons and started a sword hunt to confiscate arms. The swords were melted down to create a statue of the Buddha. This measure effectively stopped peasant revolts, and ensured greater stability at the expense of freedom of the individual daimyō.

Odawara Campaign 

In 1590, Hideyoshi carried out the Odawara Campaign against the Hōjō clan in the Kantō region. It is notable as the first battle that involved the alliance between Hideyoshi and Tokugawa Ieyasu. With 220,000 men, the massive army of Toyotomi Hideyoshi surrounded Odawara Castle and its 82,000-strong Hōjō garrison, in what has been called "the most unconventional siege lines in samurai history". The samurai were entertained by everything from concubines, prostitutes, and musicians to acrobats, fire-eaters, and jugglers. The defenders slept on the ramparts with their arquebuses and armor; despite their smaller numbers, they discouraged Hideyoshi from attacking. After three months the Hōjō surrendered, losing the will to fight after the sudden appearance of Ishigakiyama Ichiya Castle.

This eliminated the last resistance to Hideyoshi's authority. His victory signified the end of the Sengoku period. During the siege, Hideyoshi offered Ieyasu the eight Hōjō-ruled provinces in the Kantō region, in exchange for the submission of Ieyasu's five provinces. Ieyasu accepted this proposal.

Death of Sen no Rikyū 

In February 1591, Hideyoshi ordered Sen no Rikyū to commit suicide, likely in one of his angry outbursts. Rikyū had been a trusted retainer and master of the tea ceremony under both Hideyoshi and Nobunaga. Under Hideyoshi's patronage, Rikyū made significant changes to the aesthetics of the tea ceremony that had a lasting influence over many aspects of Japanese culture. After the completion of the Sanmon gate (金毛閣, in the offering written by Shunoku Sōen at the request of Rikyū, thousands of households opened their door at once said this sentence, which angered Hideyoshi then became a turning point of the relationship between Rikyū and Hideyoshi. Finally Hideyoshi ordered him to commit ritual suicide. Even after Rikyū's death, Hideyoshi is said to have built his many construction projects based upon aesthetics promoted by Rikyū, perhaps suggesting that he regretted his actions.

Following Rikyū's death, Hideyoshi turned his attention from tea ceremony to Noh, which he had been studying since becoming Imperial Regent. During his brief stay in Nagoya Castle in what is today Saga Prefecture, on Kyūshū, Hideyoshi memorised the shite (lead role) parts of ten Noh plays, which he then performed, forcing various daimyō to accompany him onstage as the waki (secondary, accompanying role). He even performed before the emperor.

Kunohe Rebellion 

The Kunohe rebellion was an insurrection in the Sengoku period of Japan, that occurred in Mutsu Province from 13 March to 4 September 1591.

Kunohe Masazane, a claimant to daimyo of the Nanbu clan, launched a rebellion against his rival Nanbu Nobunao which spread across Mutsu Province. Nobunao was backed by Toyotomi Hideyoshi, who along with Tokugawa Ieyasu sent a large army into the Tōhoku region in mid-1591 which quickly defeated the rebels. Hideyoshi's army arrived at Kunohe Castle in early September. Masazane was outnumbered and surrendered Kunohe Castle but he and the castle defenders were executed. The Kunohe rebellion was the final battle in Toyotomi Hideyoshi's campaigns during the Sengoku period and completed the unification of Japan.

Korean campaign (1592–1598)

Taikō 

The future stability of the Toyotomi dynasty after Hideyoshi's eventual death was put in doubt with the death of his son Tsurumatsu in September 1591. The three-year-old was his only child. When his half-brother Hidenaga died shortly after, Hideyoshi named his nephew Hidetsugu his heir, adopting him in January 1592. Hideyoshi resigned as kampaku to take the title of taikō (retired regent). Hidetsugu succeeded him as kampaku.

With Hideyoshi's health beginning to falter, but still yearning for some accomplishment to solidify his legacy, he adopted Oda Nobunaga's dream of a Japanese conquest of China and launched the conquest of the Ming dynasty by way of Korea (at the time known as Koryu or Joseon).

Hideyoshi had been communicating with the Koreans since 1587 requesting unmolested passage into China. As an ally of Ming China, the Joseon government of the time at first refused talks entirely, and in April and July 1591 also refused demands that Japanese troops be allowed to march through Korea.  The government of Joseon was concerned that allowing Japanese troops to march through Korea (Joseon) would mean that masses of Ming Chinese troops would battle Hideyoshi's troops on Korean soil before they could reach China, putting Korean security at risk. In August 1591, Hideyoshi ordered preparations for an invasion of Korea to begin.

First campaign against Korea 

In the first campaign, Hideyoshi appointed Ukita Hideie as field marshal, and had him go to the Korean peninsula in April 1592. Konishi Yukinaga occupied Seoul, which was the capital of the Joseon dynasty of Korea, on June 19. After Seoul fell easily, Japanese commanders held a war council in June in Seoul and determined targets of subjugation called Hachidokuniwari (literally, dividing the country into eight routes). Each targeted province was attacked by one of the army's eight divisions:
 Pyeongan by the First Division led by Konishi Yukinaga.
 Hamgyong by the Second Division led by Katō Kiyomasa.
 Hwanghae by the Third Division led by Kuroda Nagamasa.
 Gangwon by the Fourth Division led by Mōri Katsunaga.
 Chungcheong by the Fifth Division led by Fukushima Masanori.
 Jeolla by the Sixth Division led by Kobayakawa Takakage.
 Gyeongsang by the Seventh Division led by Mōri Terumoto.
 Gyeonggi by the Eighth Division led by Ukita Hideie.

In only four months, Hideyoshi's forces had a route into Manchuria and occupied much of Korea. The Korean king Seonjo of Joseon escaped to Uiju and requested military intervention from China. In 1593, the Wanli Emperor of Ming China sent an army under general Li Rusong to block the planned Japanese invasion of China and recapture the Korean peninsula. The Ming army of 43,000 soldiers headed by general Li Ru-song proceeded to attack Pyongyang. On January 7, 1593, the Ming relief forces under Li recaptured Pyongyang and surrounded Seoul, but Kobayakawa Takakage, Ukita Hideie, Tachibana Muneshige and Kikkawa Hiroie won the Battle of Byeokjegwan north of Seoul, in modern day Goyang City. At the end of the first campaign, Japan's entire navy was destroyed by Admiral Yi Sun-sin of Korea whose base was located in a part of Korea the Japanese could not control. This, in effect, put an end to Japan's dream of conquering China as the Koreans simply destroyed Japan's ability to resupply their troops who were bogged down in Seoul.

Succession dispute 

The birth of Hideyoshi's second son in 1593, Hideyori, created a potential succession problem. To avoid it, Hideyoshi exiled his nephew and heir Hidetsugu to Mount Kōya and then ordered him to commit suicide in August 1595. Hidetsugu's family members who did not follow his example were then murdered in Kyoto, including 31 women and several children.

Twenty-six martyrs of Japan 
In January 1597, Toyotomi Hideyoshi had twenty-six Christians arrested as an example to Japanese who wanted to convert to Christianity. They are known as the Twenty-six Martyrs of Japan. They included five European Franciscan missionaries, one Mexican Franciscan missionary, three Japanese Jesuits and seventeen Japanese laymen including three young boys. They were tortured, mutilated, and paraded through towns across Japan. On February 5, they were executed in Nagasaki by public crucifixion.

Second campaign against Korea 

After several years of negotiations (broken off because envoys of both sides falsely reported to their masters that the opposition had surrendered), Hideyoshi appointed Kobayakawa Hideaki to lead a renewed invasion of Korea, but their efforts on the peninsula met with less success than the first invasion. Japanese troops remained pinned down in Gyeongsang Province. In June 1598, the Japanese forces turned back several Chinese offensives in Suncheon and Sacheon, but they were unable to make further progress as the Ming army prepared for a final assault. While Hideyoshi's battle at Sacheon was a major Japanese victory, all three parties to the war were exhausted. He told his commander in Korea, "Don't let my soldiers become spirits in a foreign land.".

Death 

Toyotomi Hideyoshi died on September 18, 1598. He was delirious, with Sansom asserting that he was babbling of the distribution of fiefs. His last words, delivered to his closest daimyō and generals, were "I depend upon you for everything. I have no other thoughts to leave behind. It is sad to part from you." His death was kept secret by the Council of Five Elders to preserve morale, and they ordered the Japanese forces in Korea to withdraw back to Japan. Because of his failure to capture Korea, Hideyoshi's forces were unable to invade China. Rather than strengthen his position, the military expeditions left his clan's coffers and fighting strength depleted, his vassals at odds over responsibility for the failure, and the clans that were loyal to the Toyotomi name weakened. The Tokugawa government later not only prohibited any further military expeditions to the Asian mainland but closed Japan to nearly all foreigners during the years of the Tokugawa shogunate. It was not until the late 19th century that Japan again fought a war against China through Korea, using much the same route that Hideyoshi's invasion force had used.

After his death, the other members of the Council of Five Elders were unable to keep the ambitions of Tokugawa Ieyasu in check. Two of Hideyoshi's top generals, Katō Kiyomasa and Fukushima Masanori, had fought bravely during the war but returned to find the Toyotomi clan castellan Ishida Mitsunari in power. He held the generals in contempt, and they sided with Tokugawa Ieyasu. Hideyoshi's underage son and designated successor Hideyori lost the power his father once held, and Tokugawa Ieyasu was declared shōgun following the Battle of Sekigahara in 1600.

Family 
Father: Kinoshita Yaemon (d. 1543)
Adopted father: Konoe Sakihisa (1536-1612)
Mother: Ōmandokoro (1513–1592)
Siblings:
Toyotomi Hidenaga (1540-1591)
Tomo (1534-1625), married Soeda Jinbae
Asahi no kata (1543-1590), married first Soeda Oshinari then Tokugawa Ieyasu

Wives and concubines 

 Wife Nene (between 1541 and 1549 - 1624), or One, later Kōdai-in
 Minami-dono, daughter of Yamana Toyokuni
 Yodo-dono (1569-1615), or Chacha, later Daikōin, daughter of Azai Nagamasa
 Minami no Tsubone, daughter of Yamana Toyokuni
 Matsu no Maru-dono or Kyōgoku Tatsuko, daughter of Kyōgoku Takayoshi
Kaga-dono or Maahime, daughter of Maeda Toshiie
 Kaihime, daughter of Narita Ujinaga
 Sonnomaru-dono, adopted daughter of Gamō Ujisato, daughter of Oda Nobunaga
 Kusu no Tsubone, later Hokoin, daughter of Azai Nagamasa
 Sanjo-dono or Tora, daughter of Gamō Katahide
 Himeji-dono, daughter of Oda Nobukane
 Hirozawa no Tsubone, daughter of Kunimitsu Kyosho
 Ōshima or Shimako, later Gekkein, daughter of Ashikaga Yorizumi
 Anrunkin or Otane no Kata
 Ofuku, later Enyu-in, daughter of Miura Noto no Kami and mother of Ukita Hideie

Children 

 Hashiba Hidekatsu (Ishimatsumaru) (1570–1576) by Minami-dono
 daughter (name unknown) by Minami-dono

 Toyotomi Tsurumatsu (1589–1591) by Yodo-dono
 Toyotomi Hideyori (1593-1615) by Yodo-dono

Adopted sons 

 Hashiba Hidekatsu (Tsugaru) (1567-1586), fourth son of Oda Nobunaga
 Oda Nobutaka, later Toyotomi Takahiro (1576–1602), seventh son of Oda Nobunaga
 Oda Nobuyoshi, later Toyotomi Musashi (1573–1615), eighth son of Oda Nobunaga
 Oda Nobuyoshi (d. 1609), tenth son of Oda Nobunaga
 Ukita Hideie (1572-1655), son of Ukita Naoie
 Toyotomi Hidetsugu (1568-1595), first son of Hideyoshi's sister Tomo with Miyoshi Kazumichi
 Toyotomi Hidekatsu (1569–1592), second son of Hideyoshi's sister Tomo with Miyoshi Kazumichi
 Toyotomi Hideyasu (1579–1595), third son of Hideyoshi's sister Tomo with Miyoshi Kazumichi
 Yūki Hideyasu (1574-1607), Tokugawa Ieyasu's second son
 Ikeda Nagayoshi, third son of Ikeda Nobuteru
 Kobayakawa Hideaki (1577-1602), Hideyoshi's nephew from his wife Nenes family
 Prince Hachijō Toshihito (1579-1629), sixth son of Prince Masahito

Adopted daughters 

 Gohime (1574–1634), daughter of Maeda Toshiie, married to Ukita Hideie
 O-hime (1585–1591), daughter of Oda Nobukatsu, married to Tokugawa Hidetada
 Oeyo (1573-1626), daughter of Azai Nagamasa, married to Saji Kazunari, Toyotomi Hidekatsu, Tokugawa Hidetada
 Konoe Sakiko (1575-1630), daughter of Konoe Sakihisa, married to Emperor Go-Yōzei
 Chikurin-in (1579/80-1649), daughter of Ōtani Yoshitsugu. She was also known as Akihime and Riyohime. She was married to Sanada Yukimura. They had two sons, Sanada Daisuke and Sanada Daihachi, and some daughters
 Toyotomi Sadako (1592–1658), daughter of Toyotomi Hidekatsu with Oeyo, later became the adopted daughter of Tokugawa Hidetada and married to Kujō Yukiie
 Daizen-in, daughter of Toyotomi Hidenaga, married to Mōri Hidemoto
 Kikuhime, daughter of Toyotomi Hidenaga, married to Toyotomi Hideyasu
 Maeda Kikuhime (1578–1584), daughter of Maeda Toshiie

Grandchildren 

 Toyotomi Kunimatsu (1608-1615)
 (1609–1645)

Cultural legacy 

Toyotomi Hideyoshi changed Japanese society in many ways. These include the imposition of a rigid class structure, restrictions on travel, and surveys of land and production.

Class reforms affected commoners and warriors. During the Sengoku period, it had become common for peasants to become warriors, or for samurai to farm due to the constant uncertainty caused by the lack of centralised government and always tentative peace. Upon taking control, Hideyoshi decreed that all peasants be disarmed completely. Conversely, he required samurai to leave the land and take up residence in the castle towns. This solidified the social class system for the next 300 years.

Furthermore, he ordered comprehensive surveys and a complete census of Japan. Once this was done and all citizens were registered, he required all Japanese to stay in their respective han (fiefs) unless they obtained official permission to go elsewhere. This ensured order in a period when bandits still roamed the countryside and peace was still new. The land surveys formed the basis for systematic taxation.

In 1590, Hideyoshi completed construction of the Osaka Castle, the largest and most formidable in all Japan, to guard the western approaches to Kyoto. In that same year, Hideyoshi banned "unfree labour" or slavery in Japan, but forms of contract and indentured labour persisted alongside the period penal codes' forced labour.

Hideyoshi also influenced the material culture of Japan. He lavished time and money on the Japanese tea ceremony, collecting implements, sponsoring lavish social events, and patronizing acclaimed masters. As interest in the tea ceremony rose among the ruling class, so too did the demand for fine ceramic implements, and during the course of the Korean campaigns, not only were large quantities of prized ceramic ware confiscated but many Korean artisans were forcibly relocated to Japan. After the completion of the Golden Pavilion(金毛閣, in the offering written by the national Zen mentor しゅんおくそうえん（春屋宗園 at the request of Sen no Rikyū, thousands of households opened their door at once said this sentence, which angered Hideyoshi. He thought Sen no Rikyū had more influence than himself, then he had Rikyū commit seppuku at his residence within Hideyoshi's Jurakudai palace in Kyoto.

Inspired by the dazzling Golden Pavilion in Kyoto, he had the Golden Tea Room constructed, which was covered with gold leaf and lined inside with red gossamer. Using this mobile innovation, he was able to practice the tea ceremony wherever he went, powerfully projecting his unrivalled power and status upon his arrival.

Politically, he set up a governmental system that balanced out the most powerful Japanese warlords (or daimyō). A council was created to include the most influential lords. At the same time, a regent was designated to be in command.

Just before his death, Hideyoshi hoped to set up a system stable enough to survive until his son grew old enough to become the next leader. A  was formed, consisting of the five most powerful daimyō. Following the death of Maeda Toshiie, however, Tokugawa Ieyasu began to secure alliances, including political marriages (which had been forbidden by Hideyoshi). Eventually, the pro-Toyotomi forces fought against the Tokugawa in the Battle of Sekigahara. Ieyasu won and received the title of Seii-Tai Shōgun two years later.

Hideyoshi is commemorated at several Toyokuni Shrines scattered over Japan.

Ieyasu left in place the majority of Hideyoshi's decrees and built his shogunate upon them. This ensured that Hideyoshi's cultural legacy remained. In a letter to his wife, Hideyoshi wrote:

Names 
Because of his low birth with no family name, to the eventual achievement of Imperial Regent, the highest title of imperial nobility, Toyotomi Hideyoshi had quite a few names throughout his life. At birth, he was given the name . At genpuku, he took the name . Later, he was given the surname Hashiba and the honorary court office Chikuzen no Kami; as a result, he was styled .

The Toyotomi Uji was simultaneously granted to a number of Hideyoshi's chosen allies, who adopted the new Uji "" (Toyotomi no ason, courtier of Toyotomi).

Toyotomi Hideyoshi had been given the nickname Kozaru, meaning "little monkey", from his lord Oda Nobunaga, because his facial features and skinny form resembled those of a monkey.

In popular culture

Literature 

Hideyoshi is depicted by Eiji Yoshikawa in the novel series Taiko Ki.

In The 39 Clues series, Hideyoshi is a member of the Tomas branch of the Cahill family, the son of Thomas Cahill.

Movies 

Hideyoshi appears in the film Taikoki (1922).

Hideyoshi appeared in Castle of Owls (1963) with Ryutaro Otomo as an Iga ninja hired to assassinate Toyotomi Hideyoshi.

Hideyoshi appeared in the famous Shinobi No-Mono series (1962–1967) with Raizo Ichikawa.

Hideyoshi also appeared in the movie Sanada Yukimura no Bōryaku (1979). His role is played by Ichiro Ogura.

Hideyoshi is played by Asao Koike in Shogun's Ninja (1980). Hideyoshi sends Shiranui Shōgen to an Iga ninja clan in search of the Momochi clan's hidden gold.

Hideyoshi is a central character in the 1989 film Rikyu, played by Tsutomu Yamazaki.

In the fantasy film Goemon (2009), Hideyoshi (played by Eiji Okuda) is depicted as an evil warlord.

The television movie Taikoki (1987) is a biography of Hideyoshi.

Hideyoshi appears in the television movie Oda Nobunaga (1992).

In the 1949 Mexican hagiographic film Philip of Jesus, Luis Aceves Castañeda plays a character corresponding to Hideyoshi but named "Emperor Iroyoshi Taikosama".

TV series 

1996 NHK series (taiga drama) with Hideyoshi portrayed by Naoto Takenaka.

Toyotomi Hideyoshi tenka wo toru! (1995).

In Dokugan-ryu Masamune (1987), Hideyoshi is portrayed by Shintaro Katsu.

In the KBS1 television series Immortal Admiral Yi Sun-sin (2004–2005), Hideyoshi is portrayed by Lee Hyo-jung.

Video games 

In Onimusha, an action horror video game series by Capcom, Hideyoshi is one of the main antagonists. Similar to his real life counterpart, he makes small appearances during the first three games as a servant of Oda Nobunaga before becoming the main antagonist and ruler of Japan in the fourth game.

In the video game Nioh, Toyotomi Hideyoshi does not appear, but is mentioned by other characters and portrayed as a tyrant who committed a number of atrocities during his rule. Nioh 2 later reveals that Toyotomi Hideyoshi is an identity shared by two individuals, the player character Hide and an ambitious merchant-warrior Kinoshita Tōkichirō, and that Tōkichirō's crimes when he usurped the identity of Hideyoshi for himself were in fact committed by the antagonist Kashin Koji possessing his body.

In the Samurai Warriors series, Hideyoshi is a playable character whose weapon of choice is the sansetsukon and whose story spanned from his days serving Oda Nobunaga to his eventual conquest of Odawara. In Samurai Warriors 5, Hideyoshi wields the naginata as his main weapon, and he has more stages about his campaign against the Mōri clan while still serving the Oda clan.

In the Samurai Warriors: Katana, Hideyoshi frequently appears to give the player advice.

Manga 
Hyouge Mono (lit. "Jocular Fellow") is a Japanese manga written and illustrated by Yoshihiro Yamada. It was adapted into an anime series in 2011, and includes a fictional depiction of Toyotomi Hideyoshi's life.

In the Sengoku Basara game series and anime, he is described as a brutally strong man who killed his own wife to harden his heart, then raised an army to conquer Japan with conscripts and forced draftees. He is armed only with gauntlets, is large in physique,  and is so strong that he can deflect a hail of arrows with a wave of his hand and drain a part of the Seto Inland Sea to defeat Chosokabe Motochika. Many of his subordinates and allies, such as Takenaka Hanbei and Ishida Mitsunari, are also major characters in the series.

Anime 
In the Netflix anime series Great Pretender (2020), Hideyoshi is referenced many times by Laurent Thierry, one of the central protagonists of the series.

Documentary 
In the Netflix documentary series Age of Samurai: Battle for Japan (2021), Hideyoshi is portrayed by Masami Kosaka. The show depicts his life and rise to power.

Honours 
 Senior First Rank (August 18, 1915; posthumous)

See also 

 People of the Sengoku period in popular culture#Toyotomi Hideyoshi
 Itsukushima's Senjokaku Hall
 Dom Justo Takayama
 :hr:Toyotomi Hideyoshi

Notes

References 
 Berry, Mary Elizabeth. (1982). Hideyoshi. Cambridge: Harvard UP, ; 
 Haboush, JaHyun Kim.  (2016) The Great East Asian War and the Birth of the Korean Nation (2016) excerpt
 Jansen, Marius B. (2000). The Making of Modern Japan. Cambridge: Harvard UP. ; 
 Nussbaum, Louis-Frédéric and Käthe Roth. (2005).  Japan encyclopedia. Cambridge: Harvard University Press. ;

External links 

 The Christian Century in Japan, by Charles Boxer

1537 births
1598 deaths
16th-century Japanese people
Daimyo
Samurai
Sesshō and Kampaku
Toyotomi clan
Warlords
Oda retainers
People from Nagoya
People of Muromachi-period Japan
People of Azuchi–Momoyama-period Japan
Military engineers
People of the Japanese invasions of Korea (1592–1598)
16th-century Japanese calligraphers
Deified Japanese people
Kabuki characters